Delångersån is a river in Sweden. After Ljusnan and Voxnan, it is the third longest river in Hälsingland.

References

Rivers of Sweden